Statistics of Swiss Super League in the 1977–78 season.

Overview
It was contested by 12 teams, and Grasshopper Club Zürich won the championship.

First stage

Table

Results

Second stage

Playoff

Table

Results

Playout

Table

Results

Sources
 Switzerland 1977–78 at RSSSF

Swiss Football League seasons
Swiss
1977–78 in Swiss football